Digging For Britain is a British television series focused on last and current year archaeology. The series is made by 360 Production (now Rare TV) for the BBC and is presented by Alice Roberts. It was first aired in August 2010.

The series focuses on archaeological excavations and research in the United Kingdom, both at new sites and those already well known to science. Filming has taken place in many parts of the country.

Its 10th series will be broadcast in January and February 2023 and it will consist of 6 episodes.

Production
The first series consisted of four episodes, initially broadcast on BBC Two in August and September 2010. A second series of four episodes was broadcast in September 2011. Each episodes of first two series had covered archaeology of specific period. The programme returned as a series of three episodes on BBC Four in February 2015, covering the previous summer's investigations in specific geographical region of the United Kingdom in each episode. Each episode of this series was hosted in a regional museum. The same format as in series 3 was adopted for series 4 and 5, which first aired in March and December 2016, respectively. There was also a programme Digging for Ireland linked to the series which had the same format and presenters as series 5; it was broadcast in February 2015. A sixth series of the programme began airing in November 2017, returning to the four-episode format (covering three geographical regions plus one special theme). This structure was retained for series 7 and 8, which aired in November 2018 and 2019 respectively. Four episodes titled The Greatest Discoveries aired in 2020. It returned for its 9th series in January 2022.

Since series 3, with exception of series 5, the programme was co-presented in various forms. Some presenters are former members of the Time Team crew (as is Roberts). The series 3 and 4 by archaeologist Matt Williams (who also presented some Time Team episodes). (Roberts and Williams also presented Digging for Ireland.) Raksha Dave (archaeologist in Time Team) series 7. The archaeologist and academic Naoíse Mac Sweeney was a presenter in series 8. Series 9 features historian Onyeka Nubia and archaeologists Cat Jarman and Stuart Prior in some episodes as presenters.

The song Coins for Eyes was written for series 9 by Johnny Flynn and Robert Macfarlane.

Episodes

Archaeologists
Matt Williams
Raksha Dave
Naoíse Mac Sweeney
Cat Jarman 
Stuart Prior

Notes

References

External links

 

2010s British documentary television series
2010 British television series debuts
Archaeology of the United Kingdom
BBC television documentaries about history
Television series about the history of the United Kingdom